Allan Kenny Wellman (born 26 May 1954) is a former Guatemalan football player.

Club career
Wellmann played thirteen seasons for C.S.D. Comunicaciones, making his debut in 1973 at age 19, and five seasons with Aurora F.C.
He became a club director of the Cremas after retiring from the game.

International career
Wellmann made several appearances for the senior Guatemala national football team, including qualifying matches for the 1978, 1982 and 1990 FIFA World Cup.

He also played for Guatemala at the 1976 Summer Olympics in Montreal and the 1988 Summer Olympics in Seoul.

References

1954 births
Living people
Guatemalan footballers
Guatemala international footballers
Footballers at the 1976 Summer Olympics
Footballers at the 1988 Summer Olympics
Olympic footballers of Guatemala
Comunicaciones F.C. players
Aurora F.C. players
Association football defenders